Ezhuthatha Kadha is a 1970 Indian Malayalam-language film,  directed by A. B. Raj and produced by T. E. Vasudevan. The film stars Prem Nazir, Sheela, Adoor Bhasi and Muthukulam Raghavan Pillai. The film had musical score by V. Dakshinamoorthy.

Plot
Prathapan wants to publish memoirs of Kamalamma, a former prostitute and stage star. When her former clients learn about this, they try everything in their power to stop it from being published.

Cast 

Prem Nazir as Prathapachandran
Sheela as Kayamkulam Kamalamma
Adoor Bhasi as Bhaskaran Pillai
Muthukulam Raghavan Pillai as Raghavan Pillai
Sankaradi as Tabalist Shanku Asan
T. R. Omana as Eashwariyamma, Prathapachandran's Mother
Chandrakala as Meena
G. K. Pillai as Palathara Thomachan
K. P. Ummer as Gopalan Nair
Meena as Mrs. Nair
Nellikode Bhaskaran as Drama-troupe Manager
Paravoor Bharathan as Padmanabhan
Thikkurissy Sukumaran Nair as Parameswaran/Kattazham Karthavu
T. K. Balachandran as Blind Singer, drama artist
Paul Vengola as Advocate's clerk
Vanchiyoor Radha as Manager's sister
Thodupuzha Radhakrishnan as Govindan Muthalali
Abbas as Palathara Thomachan's gunda
Rathidevi as Young Meena
Vembayam Thampi as committee secretary

Soundtrack 
The music was composed by V. Dakshinamoorthy and the lyrics were written by Sreekumaran Thampi.

References

External links 
 

1970 films
1970s Malayalam-language films
Best Malayalam Feature Film National Film Award winners